Prem Singh may refer to:

 Prem Singh (Fijian politician)
 Prem Singh (Delhi politician)
 Prem Singh (Himachal politician)

It may also refer to;

Prem Singh Tamang, also known as P.S. Golay, Sikkim politician
Prem Singh Chandumajra (1950-), Punjabi politician
Prem Singh Lalpur (1925-2011), Punjabi politician
Prem Singh Brahma, former leader of the Bodo Liberation Tigers Force
Prem Singh Labana, social and religious leader of the Labana Sihks
Prem Singh Rana, Uttarakhand politician
Prem Singh Dhami, Nepalese politician

prem singh chaudhary look like a dog